Hsieh Cheng-peng and Peng Hsien-yin were the defending champions but chose to defend their title with different partners. Hsieh partnered Christopher Rungkat and successfully defended his title. Peng partnered Aliaksandr Bury but lost in the semifinals to Hsieh and Rungkat.

Hsieh and Rungkat won the title after defeating Ruan Roelofse and John-Patrick Smith 6–4, 6–3 in the final.

Seeds

Draw

References
 Main Draw
 Qualifying Draw

Busan Open - Doubles
2018 Doubles